Botou is a county-level city in Hebei province, People's Republic of China, under the jurisdiction of Cangzhou prefecture-level city.

Administrative Divisions

Subdistricts: Jiefang Subdistrict, Hedong Subdistrict, Gulou Subdistrict

Towns: Bozhen, Jiaohe, Qiqiao, Simencun, Haocun, Fuzhen, Wenmiao, Waliwang

Townships: Wangwuzhuang Township, Yingzi Township, Siying Township, Xixindian Township

Climate

References 

 
County-level cities in Hebei
Cangzhou